Herding is the act of bringing individual animals together into a group (herd), maintaining the group, and moving the group from place to place—or any combination of those. Herding can refer either to the process of animals forming herds in the wild, or to human intervention forming herds for some purpose. While the layperson uses the term "herding" to describe this human intervention, most individuals involved in the process term it mustering, "working stock", or droving.

Some animals instinctively gather together as a herd. A group of animals fleeing a predator will demonstrate herd behavior for protection; while some predators, such as wolves and dogs have instinctive herding abilities derived from primitive hunting instincts. Instincts in herding dogs and trainability can be measured at noncompetitive herding tests. Dogs exhibiting basic herding instincts can be trained to aid in herding and to compete in herding and stock dog trials. Sperm whales have also been observed teaming up to herd prey in a coordinated feeding behavior.

Herding is used in agriculture to manage domesticated animals. Herding can be performed by people or trained animals such as herding dogs that control the movement of livestock under the direction of a person. The people whose occupation it is to herd or control animals often have herd added to the name of the animal they are herding to describe their occupation (shepherd, goatherd, cowherd). 

A competitive sport has developed in some countries where the combined skill of man and herding dog is tested and judged in a "trial", such as a sheepdog trial. Animals such as sheep, camel, yak, and goats are mostly reared. They provide milk, meat and other products to the herders and their families.

References

 
Animal migration